The first-generation iPod Touch, (colloquially known as the iPod Touch 1G, iPod Touch 1, or original iPod Touch) is a multi-touch mobile device designed and marketed by Apple Inc. with a touchscreen-based user interface. The first device of the iPod Touch series, it was unveiled and released at Apple's media event on September 5, 2007. It is compatible with up to iPhone OS 3.1.3 which was released on February 2, 2010.

History 
The first-generation iPod touch was released after the first-generation iPhone as a companion device. It had similar features, but a thinner design with an all-metal back except for a small corner cut out for WiFi 802.11 b/g, allowing it to use Safari to browse websites. It used the same 30-pin connector as the first-generation iPhone and previous iPods, allowing most iPod accessories to work with the iPod touch.

Features

Software 
It fully supports iPhone OS 1 to iPhone OS 3, though it received different features at different times from the first-generation iPhone. It also did not have the iPod app as it was an iPod, and instead had the Music app for playing music and podcasts, with a separate Videos app to watch videos. It also received the iTunes Store app before the iPhone did - the first-generation iPod touch received the iTunes Store app on launch with iPhone OS 1.1 on September 14, 2007, while the first-generation iPhone received the iTunes Store app on September 27, 2007 with the release of iPhone OS 1.1.1. It also had Calendar, Clock, Calculator, and Photos apps preinstalled.

Emulation
In December of 2022, Internet user Martijn de Vos, also known as devos50 has reverse engineered this device to successfully create a QEMU emulation of this device, running iPhone OS 1.0.

References 

iPod